Psychrobacter arenosus is a Gram-negative, psychrotolerant, aerobic, nonmotile bacterium of the genus Psychrobacter, which was isolated from coastal sea ice and sediment samples of the Sea of Japan.

References

External links
Type strain of Psychrobacter arenosus at BacDive -  the Bacterial Diversity Metadatabase

Moraxellaceae
Bacteria described in 2004